Chester is an unincorporated community in Wayne Township, Wayne County, in the U.S. state of Indiana.

History
A post office was established at Chester in 1848, and remained in operation until it was discontinued in 1901.

Geography

References

Unincorporated communities in Wayne County, Indiana
Unincorporated communities in Indiana